Çekdar Orhan (born 8 March 1998) is a Turkish football player who plays as a forward for Tuzlaspor on loan from Giresunspor.

Professional career
Born in Turkey and raised in Germany, Orhan is a youth product of the German clubs Borussia Mönchengladbach, Wuppertaler SV, 1. FC Mönchengladbach and Rot-Weiß Oberhausen. He returned to Turkey with the academy of Galatasaray in 2018. He began his senior career with Akhisarspor in the TFF First League in 2019, before transferring to Giresunspor on 15 August 2021. He made his professional debut with Giresunspor in a 2-1 Süper Lig loss to Antalyaspor on 1 November 2021.

Personal life
Orhan is the nephew of the Turkish actors Yılmaz Erdoğan and Ersin Korkut.

References

External links
 
 
 DFB Profile

1998 births
Living people
People from Hakkâri
Turkish footballers
Turkey youth international footballers
Association football midfielders
Akhisarspor footballers
Giresunspor footballers
Tuzlaspor players
Süper Lig players
TFF First League players
Turkish expatriate footballers
Expatriate footballers in Germany
Turkish expatriate sportspeople in Germany